Simon Messingham is a British science fiction writer, and a comedy writer and performer, who has written six Doctor Who novels and another Doctor Who story released as a BBC Audio Drama. Messingham has also witten an original novel, Sirens, which was released in 2017. He also wrote and performed in the cable television programmes The Dave Saint Show and Tales of Uplift and Moral Improvement Messingham is also an actor. He went to drama school and have worked in the theatre.

Selected bibliography

Doctor Who novels

Virgin New Adventures

Strange England (1994)

Past Doctor Adventures

Zeta Major (1998)
Tomb of Valdemar (2000)
The Indestructible Man (2004)

Eighth Doctor Adventures

The Face-Eater (1999)
The Infinity Race (2002)

New Series Adventures

The Doctor Trap (2008)

Short fiction

Audio books

 The Day of the Troll (BBC, 2009)

References

External links
Interview with Messingham BBC Doctor Who'' website

Living people
Alumni of Bretton Hall College
British science fiction writers
Writers of Doctor Who novels
21st-century British short story writers
21st-century British male writers
20th-century British male writers
20th-century British novelists
21st-century British novelists
British male novelists
Year of birth missing (living people)